Erin D. Herbig is an American serving as the city manager of the city of Belfast, Maine. She previously served as a member of the Maine Senate and Maine House of Representatives. Herbig earned a Bachelor of Arts degree in English from Boston College in 2003 and is a graduate of the Emerge program, which trains Democratic women to run for office.

References

21st-century American politicians
21st-century American women politicians
Morrissey College of Arts & Sciences alumni
Living people
Democratic Party Maine state senators
Democratic Party members of the Maine House of Representatives
Majority leaders of the Maine House of Representatives
People from Belfast, Maine
Women state legislators in Maine
Year of birth missing (living people)